Luis Hernández Rodríguez (born 14 April 1989) is a Spanish professional footballer who plays as a centre-back for Cádiz.

He joined the Real Madrid academy as a nine-year-old, but never made an appearance for the senior team. He made his professional debut with Sporting de Gijón in 2012, playing 139 competitive matches and scoring one goal across four seasons. He then signed with Premier League club Leicester City, playing nine games before moving to Málaga in January 2017. In 2020, he joined Maccabi Tel Aviv.

Club career

Early years
Born in Madrid, Hernández finished his formative years with hometown club Real Madrid, making his senior debuts by first representing the C and then the B team. In August 2011, he was expected to join Belgian Pro League side Gent but nothing came of it.

Sporting Gijón

In January 2012, Hernández went on trial with Getafe B. However, he signed an 18-month deal with Sporting de Gijón instead, being assigned to the reserves in Segunda División B. On 2 September 2012, he made his professional debut in the Segunda División, playing the full 90 minutes in a 0–0 away draw against Racing de Santander.

On 31 January 2013, Hernández was promoted to the Asturians' first team alongside Borja López. He finished the season as an undisputed starter, appearing in 21 matches in all competitions.

Hernández was an ever-present figure in the following campaigns, playing 38 league games in 2013–14 and 41 in 2014–15. He scored his first goal for the team on 24 November 2013, netting their first in a 3–1 win at Lugo.

On 23 August 2015, Hernández made his La Liga debut, starting in a 0–0 home draw against Real Madrid. He made a total of 140 interceptions, more than any other player during the season, while Sporting barely survived relegation by a point.

Leicester City

On 21 June 2016, Hernández signed for Premier League champions Leicester City in a free transfer on a four-year deal. He made his competitive debut on 7 August, coming on as a 63rd-minute substitute for Danny Simpson in a 2–1 loss against Manchester United in the FA Community Shield. His first appearance in the UEFA Champions League took place on 14 September, in a 3–0 group stage win at Club Brugge.

Hernández ultimately struggled to break into the first team in 2016–17, appearing mostly as an unused substitute. In January 2017, Málaga were reported to be in advanced talks with Leicester over a possible loan deal for the player.

Málaga
On 24 January 2017, after spending just six months in England, Hernández returned to Spain and its top level to join Málaga on a three-and-a-half-year deal for an undisclosed fee. He made his debut three days later in a 1–1 draw away to Osasuna, and scored his first goal for the club on 14 May in another away fixture, 2–2 against Real Sociedad.

Hernández scored his second goal for the team on 12 June 2019, in a 4–2 defeat to Deportivo de La Coruña in the first leg of the promotion play-offs semi-final. He also took part in the second match, a 1–0 loss.

Along with seven other first-team players, Hernández was released on 3 October 2020 due to a layoff.

Maccabi Tel Aviv
Hernández joined Maccabi Tel Aviv on 5 October 2020, agreeing to a one-year contract with an option to extend a further season. His team came runners-up in the Israeli Premier League in his first season, and he also scored in extra time to help them defeat Hapoel Tel Aviv 2–1 in the final of the State Cup.

Cádiz
On 31 January 2022, Hernández returned to Spain and its top tier after signing a 18-month deal with Cádiz.

Career statistics

References

External links

1989 births
Living people
Spanish footballers
Footballers from Madrid
Association football defenders
La Liga players
Segunda División players
Segunda División B players
Tercera División players
Real Madrid C footballers
Real Madrid Castilla footballers
Sporting de Gijón B players
Sporting de Gijón players
Málaga CF players
Cádiz CF players
Premier League players
Leicester City F.C. players
Israeli Premier League players
Maccabi Tel Aviv F.C. players
Spanish expatriate footballers
Expatriate footballers in England
Expatriate footballers in Israel
Spanish expatriate sportspeople in England
Spanish expatriate sportspeople in Israel